Ginga may refer to:

Japanese

Other
 "Ginga" (single), a 2005 single from Japanese rock band Fujifabric
 Yokosuka P1Y Ginga, a Japanese bomber aircraft

TV
 Ginga (middleware), a Japanese-Brazilian digital TV middleware

Series
 Ginga Nagareboshi Gin, a Japanese manga/anime series from the 1980s
 Ultraman Ginga, a Japanese 2013 tokusatsu series created by Tsuburaya Productions

Characters
 Ginga Hagane, from Beyblade: Metal Fusion
 Ginga Nakajima, from Magical Girl Lyrical Nanoha StrikerS

Trains
 Ginga (train), a Japanese overnight train
 SL Ginga, a Japanese excursion train

Other uses
 Ginga (satellite), an astronomical satellite,
 Ginga, a slang term for a person with red hair
 Ginga (capoeira), a style of footwork used in the martial art capoeira.
 Ginga Scout, a location-based soccer application

See also 

 Ginger

Ginga is also a simple move from the capoeira dance. The capoeira dance comes from Brazil.